Stibinin, also known as stibabenzene, is an organic chemical compound. Stibinin has the chemical formula . The molecule, stibinin, is a derivative of benzene, with one of the carbon atoms in the 6-membered ring replaced by an antimony (Sb) atom. Stibinin is a molecule that is considered to be an organoantimony compound due to it containing carbon, hydrogen, and antimony atoms.

Laboratory synthesis 
The synthesis of stibinin can be accomplished in a three step process. The final product can be isolated, even though the molecule is highly labile. The first step of this synthesis involves the treatment of penta-1,4-diyne with dibutylstannane as shown in the figure below.

The second step of the synthesis involves reacting the product of the first step, 1,1-dibutyl-1,4-dihydrostannine, with antimony trichloride, to yield 1-chloro-1-stibacyclohexa-2,5-diene.

The final step of the synthesis of stibinin involves treating 1-chloro-1-stibacyclohexa-2,5-diene with a base, such as DBN, to yield the final product of stibinin.

Similar compounds 
It is noted that other benzene derivatives with one carbon replaced with a group 15 element can be synthesized via a similar synthetic pathway to that which stibinin is synthesized. The reaction of 1,1-dibutyl-1,4-dihydrostannine with arsenic trichloride, phosphorus tribromide, or bismuth trichloride can yield arsabenzene, phosphabenzene, or 1-chloro-1-bismacyclohexa-2,5-diene respectively. Treatment of 1-chloro-1-bismacyclohexa-2,5-diene with a base, such as DBN, can yield the product bismabenzene.

See also
 6-membered aromatic rings with one carbon replaced by another group: borabenzene, silabenzene, germabenzene, stannabenzene, pyridine, phosphorine, arsabenzene, stibabenzene, bismabenzene, pyrylium, thiopyrylium, selenopyrylium, telluropyrylium

References

Antimony heterocycles